"If She Would Have Been Faithful..." is a song by American rock band Chicago, released in March 1987 as the third single from their 1986 album Chicago 18, with Jason Scheff singing lead vocals. The song was written by Steve Kipner and Randy Goodrum. It was a top 10 Adult Contemporary hit and also reached No. 17 on the U.S. Billboard Hot 100 chart.

References

1986 songs
1987 singles
Chicago (band) songs
Rock ballads
Songs written by Randy Goodrum
Songs written by Steve Kipner
Song recordings produced by David Foster
Full Moon Records singles
Warner Records singles